Ludwig Ernest Frank Langer (January 22, 1893 – July 5, 1984) was an American competition swimmer who competed in freestyle events.  He was one of six Hawaii-based swimmers who competed at the 1920 Summer Olympics and collectively won seven medals.  Langer won a silver medal in the 400-meter freestyle, but failed to reach the final of the 1,500-meter freestyle.

Domestically Langer won the 440-yard, 880-yard and one-mile freestyle events at the 1915 and 1916 Amateur Athletic Union (AAU) championships.  He won his seventh AAU title in 1921, beating Johnny Weissmuller in the 440-yard freestyle.  By 1916 he held world records over 440-yard, 880-yard and one-mile distances, but could not compete in the Olympics due to World War I.

In 1988 he was posthumously inducted into the International Swimming Hall of Fame.

See also
 List of members of the International Swimming Hall of Fame

References

External links

 

1893 births
1984 deaths
American male freestyle swimmers
Olympic silver medalists for the United States in swimming
Swimmers from Los Angeles
Swimmers at the 1920 Summer Olympics
Medalists at the 1920 Summer Olympics